Luts may refer to:

People
Aksella Luts (1905–2005), Estonian filmmaker and actress
Eduard Luts (1899–1942), Estonian politician
Karin Luts (1904–1993), Estonian painter and printmaker
Karl Luts (1883–1942), Estonian oil shale chemist and politician
Meta Luts (1905–1958), Estonian actress
Oskar Luts (1887–1953), Estonian writer and playwright
Peter Luts (born 1971), Belgian-Irish DJ
Siim Luts (born 1989), Estonian footballer
Theodor Luts (1896–1980), Estonian film director and cinematographer

Other uses
Lower urinary tract symptoms (LUTS)
Lookup table, in film colour grading

See also
 Lut (disambiguation)

Estonian-language surnames